The Marikina Valley Fault System, also known as the Valley Fault System (VFS), is a dominantly right-lateral strike-slip fault system in Luzon, Philippines. It extends from Doña Remedios Trinidad, Bulacan in the north and runs through the provinces of Rizal, and the Metro Manila cities of Quezon, Marikina, Pasig, Makati, Taguig and Muntinlupa, and the provinces of Cavite and Laguna that ends in Canlubang.

Fault segments

The fault contains two major segments, known as West Valley Fault (WVF) and East Valley Fault (EVF).

West Valley Fault

The west segment, known as the West Valley Fault (WVF), is one of the two major fault segments of the Valley Fault System which runs through Metro Manila to the cities of Marikina, Quezon City, Pasig, Makati, Taguig and Muntinlupa and moves in a dominantly dextral strike-slip motion.

The West Fault is capable of producing large scale earthquakes on its active phases with a magnitude of 7 or higher.

East Valley Fault
The eastern segment, known as East Valley Fault (EVF), moves in an oblique dextral motion.

Threat

Based on kinematic block models that utilize GPS, actual fault geometry, and earthquake focal mechanisms, the West segment of the Marikina Fault was resolved to be almost fully locked, meaning it is currently accumulating and loading elastic strain, at the rate of 10 to 12 mm/yr.
The fault possesses a threat of a large scale earthquake with an estimated magnitude between 6–7 and as high as 7.6  to Metro Manila and surrounding provinces with death toll predicted to be as high as 35,000 and some 120,000 or higher injured and more than three million needed to be evacuated.

References

External links
Valley Fault System (VFS): Marikina Quadrangle – Philippine Institute of Volcanology and Seismology
High resolution West Valley Fault maps launched - Rappler
PHIVOLCS FaultFinder  - This web app is a product of the joint collaboration between PHIVOLCS, DOST, GSJ, AIST. It was developed by Dr. Joel C. Bandibas of GSJ with the cooperation of the research and development personnel of PHIVOLCS.

Geography of Bulacan
Geography of Metro Manila
Geography of Rizal
Geology of the Philippines
Marikina
Seismic faults of Southeast Asia